Durocortorum was the name of the city Reims during the Roman era. It was the capital of the Remi tribe and the second largest city in Roman Gaul.

Before the Roman conquest of northern Gaul, the city was founded circa 80 BC, served as the capital of the tribe of the Remi. In the course of Julius Caesar's conquest of Gaul (58–51 BC), the Remi allied themselves with the Romans, and, by their fidelity throughout the various Gallic insurrections, secured the special favour of imperial power. At its height in Roman times the city had a population in the range of 30,000 – 50,000 or perhaps up to 100,000, and was an important node in the road system of Gallia Belgica. After the installation of Magnus Maximus in Augusta Treverorum, Durocortorum was renamed Metropolis Civitas Remorum, and no longer served as the capital of Gallia Belgica although it remained the capital of Belgica Secunda.

Etymology and historical mentions 
The Latin Durocortōrum comes from the Celtic "Durocorteron" ("round fortress"). It was an oppidum of the tribe of the Remi founded circa 80 BC, and served as its capital.

Mentions of Durocortorum from sources during Antiquity in chronological order are:
By Ptolemy in his Geography, II, 9, 6 Duricortora.
By Julius Caesar in his Gallic wars, VI, 44, and to 3.
By Strabo in his Geographica, IV, 3, 5.
By Ammianus Marcellinus in his Res gestae XV, 11-10. 
In the proceedings of the Synod of Arles (314) in codex C 37 civitas Remorum, K 27, A 24, D 24 (Item de Galleis. Inbetausius episcopus, Primigenius diaconus de ciuitate Remorum [Reims]).
By Saint Jerome, in his letter CXXIII, 15 to Gerchia, Remorum urbs.
In the Codex Theodosianus, Valens and Valentinian II are in Durocortorum in 366 and 367 promulgating imperial ordinances (book VIII, 7 given at Durocortorum on 7 April 366 ; book XI, 1 given at Durocortorum 19 May 366 ; ...book XIV, 4 given at Durocortorum 8 June 367).
In the Notitia Dignitatum, the city is mentioned for its sword manufacturing (Western empire IX, 36) for its manufacturing of court wear (Western empire XI, 56), its workshops for gold or silver jewellery (Western empire XI, 76), as the residence of the main tax collector (????? French: Directeur des caisses générales de comte des Largesses) (Western empire XI, 34), and the prefect of the laeti and heathens ( Western empire XLII, 42).

Durocortorum, oppidum of the Remi 

Before the foundation of Durocorteron, the main settlement of the Remi was an oppidum located near the current villages of Variscourt and Condé-sur-Suippe close to Reims. Founded between 450 and 200 BC during the La Tène I and II period, it already covered some 500 Hectares, and was most likely surrounded by two concentric walls or ditches. As shown by archeological finds in the necropolises found at the site, it was then succeeded by the oppidum of Durocortoron (latinised to Durocortorum) at the location of the city Reims.

Since the Gauls had a culture of orally transmitting information, little information exists on Durocortorum before the arrival of the Romans. However, it was widely considered to be the northernmost civilised city. Archaeological excavations show it was sparsely inhabited since the La Tène period. The town of 90 Hectares was centred around the current "place Royal" in Reims and protected by fortifications, consisting of an of 50 metres length, 8 metre deep ditch and an earth wall, probably capped with a wooden palisade.

The Remi and Rome 

At the time of Caesar's invasion of Gaul, the territory of the Remi stretched from the Seine to the Marne and the Meuse in northeastern Gaul, on the southern border of Gallia Belgica. On seeing the advance of the armies of Julius Caesar, the Belgae united to push back the invasion. The Remi, however, stayed out of this coalition and decided to ally themselves with the Romans. They sent two representatives with offerings to negotiate, and tried in vain to convince the Suessiones, a kin tribe with whom they shared laws and government, to follow them.

In 57 BC the Belgae attacked the oppidum Bibrax at the battle of the Axona. However, Caesar's legions were victorious and successfully defended the oppidum. After Caesar's retreat, the armies of the Belgae attacked the Remi, but the Roman troops made a U-turn and came back to help their allies. The Remi remained loyal allies of Rome during all of the Gallic wars. Durocortorum was therefore declared an allied city and allowed to be independent with the privilege of keeping its laws, religion, and government, and the Suessiones were put under their dominion.

In 53 BC, Caesar ordered a concilium Galliae to unite at Durocortorum in order to judge Acco, chief of the Carnutes, for the conspiracy between the Senones and the Carnutes. Under Augustus, its territory was integrated in the province Gallia Belgica of which Durocortorum became the capital.

The Gallo-Roman city 

The city had an area of about 500 to 600 Hectares. Having the same centre as the earlier Gaulic oppidum, it possessed a regular street plan with 15 metre wide streets flanked by a gutter. The street plan had two major axes which can still be found in present day Reims: the cardo major (rue de Vesle, avenue Jean Jaures), and the decumanus major (rue de l'Université, rue Anatole-France and rue Colbert), which crossed in the centre (place Royale). The Gaulic city likely occupied a little natural height that dominated the swamp where the Vesle streamed in the opposite direction of its general course, but the height is now probably about 6 metres below street level.

For its period, the Gallo-Roman city was huge: it was the capital of Gallia Belgica and one of the largest cities north-west of Rome. It was delineated by four monumental gates of which the Porte de Mars, dedicated to the god of war, was oriented towards Gallia Belgica that was in the process of pacification. Of the other ones, only some remains of the gate of Dionysus (Porte Bazée) have survived. Veritable triumph arcs were erected on the diagonals connecting the gates to glorify the invader-colonisers. From de gate of Ceres roads divided towards Augusta Treverorum (Trier), Divodorum (Metz) and Colonia Agrippina (Cologne). Next to, and just outside the gate of Ceres was the craftsmen quarter that was mainly specialised in working bone. From the gate of Mars roads went towards Bavacum (Bavay), Tervanna (Thérouanne) and the port of Gesoriacum (Boulogne-sur-mer). From the gate of Venus a single road, due to having to cross the swamp, directed towards Lutetia (Paris). From the gate of Dionysus, roads split towards Rome and Tullum Leucorum (Toul). Cemeteries lined the roads entering and leaving the city.

Other roads of the Gallo Roman city were, as typical for Roman cities, parallel and orthogonal to the cardo- and decumanos majores. At the end of the 2nd century, the city was developing rapidly, benefitting from the progressively ensuing Pax Romana which resulted in increased commerce. It was in this period that the above mentioned gates were constructed as well as the enormous covered area of the cryptoportique, a U shaped 100 by 50metre long heightened area that made out the northern part of the Forum, and which became the commercial centre of the city. A market was probably held close (perhaps at the current rue du Marc). The city also had an amphitheatre, a stadium (rue Gosset), an arena (Rue du Mont-d'Arène), thermae, temples and rich villas as witnessed by the mosaics that were found. The city also had its own supply of fresh water from an aqueduct to the Suippe, a sewage system and a waste dump.

Christianity had become established in the city by 260, at which period Saint Sixtus founded the bishopric of Reims.

Decline of the city during the late Roman Empire 

The consul Jovinus, an influential supporter of Christianity, repelled the Alamanni who invaded Champagne in 336. In 357 and 366 invasions of Germanic tribes are pushed back before they reach Metropolis Civitas Remorum (Reims) as Durocortorum is called during this period. The city did not have defensive fortifications yet, and the progressively declining Roman Empire did not have sufficient military forces to protect it. At the time the city extended beyond the large Gallo Roman ditch, but the population declined and found refuge within the perimeter delimited by four Roman gates. The enclosure can still be found in the street plan formed by the rue de Talleyrand, rue de Chanzy, rue de Contrai, and the rue des Murs, named after walls that were built during that period, rue Ponsardin, rue Rogier, rue Andrieuz, and the boulevard Désaubeau. On a small hill outside of the city, what is now the "quartier St. Remi", a small borough developed.

The defences would not prove sufficient, however. In 406 the Vandals descended on the city and pillaged it. The inhabitants fled to the Christian cathedral, where the bishop Nicasius of Rheims was decapitated on the doorstep while trying to slow them down. In 451 the Huns attacked. Hardly anything is left from this period except some traces of fortifications and the Roman road system that had not been changed. It seems the city was burned down and rebuilt several times, but little can still be found since the inhabitants, much poorer now, used cheap and easy to work but perishable materials such as wood, straw and clay.

Archaeology 
Extensive excavations have been made since the 19th century at city extensions, the new railway station, etc. They have revealed the Roman houses, the gate of Mars, the sanctuary on the rue Belin, the forum, thermae, and the necropolis at the exits of the city.

Several Roman Domus where excavated
the house of Muranus, at the hautes promenades,
the house of Mercurius, at the rue Eugène-Desteuque,
the house of the rosary, at the rue Eugène Desteuque, 
the house of the fishes and of the pergola at the rue Chanzy and the rue Libergier dating to the 1st century AD,
the house with the garden, at the rue des Capucins,
the house of lovers, at the rue des Capucins and the rue Boulard,
the house of Aries, at the rue des Capucins et rue Boulard,
the house of the Mission square, below the monument of the dead of Reims,
the house of the bird, at the rue des Marmouzets,
the house of flowers, at the rue de la Paix, dating from the 2nd century AD,
the house of Nocturnus, at the rue des Moissons,
the house of the gladiators, on the hautes promenades, dating from the 3rd century AD.

References

Citations

General references 
 Attribution

 This article is based on the equivalent French Wikipedia article accessed 17 March 2019.
 
 
 
 Nicolas Bergier, Le Dessein de l'histoire de Reims, avec diverses curieuses remarques touchant l'establissement des peuples et la fondation des villes de France, chez Nicolas Hécart, 1635.
 Charles Loriquet, Notice sur les antiquités de Reims, les découvertes récemment faites et les mesures adoptées pour la conservation des anciens monuments de la ville, 1861.
 Narcisse Brunette, Reims pendant la domination romaine d'après les inscriptions par Ch. Loriquet, bibliothécaire et archiv. de la ville de Reims,..., 1860.
 Ernest Kalas, les aspects du vieux Reims in Bulletin de la socièté archologique champenoise de 1912.
 Robert Neiss, Stéphane Sindonino, Civitas Remi – Reims et son enceinte au IVe siècle, in : Bulletin de la Société Archéologique Champenoise, tome 97, 2004. n°4.
 Robert Neiss, Agnés Balmelle, Les maisons de l'élite à Durocortorum, in : Bulletin de la Société Archéologique Champenoise, tome 96, n°4, 2003.
 Raphaëlle Chossenot, Angélique Estéban, Robert Neiss, Carte archéologique de la Gaule, pré-inventaire archéologique..., Académie des Inscriptions et Belles-Lettres ; Paris ; Ministère de l'Educaton Nationale ; Ministère de la Recherche ; Ministère de la Culture et de la Communication; Maison des Sciences de l'Homme, 2010.
 Richard Stilwell e.a, The Princeton Encyclopedia of Classical Sites, Durocortorum.

Roman Gaul
Reims
Roman towns and cities in France